Chaerophyllum tainturieri, known by the common names hairyfruit chervil and southern chervil, is an annual forb native to the south-eastern United States, with disjunct populations in Arizona and New Mexico. It is a common plant, found in glades, fields, and disturbed areas. It produces small white umbels of flowers in the spring.

This species was the subject of a germination study, which revealed a new type of seed dormancy.

References

External links

tainturieri
Flora of the Southeastern United States
Flora of the Great Plains (North America)
Flora of the United States
Flora of Arizona
Flora of New Mexico
Flora of Texas
Taxa named by William Jackson Hooker
Flora without expected TNC conservation status